Ladenbergia muzonensis, synonyms including Ladenbergia ulei, is a species of plant in the family Rubiaceae. It is native to north-western South America: Colombia, Ecuador, Peru and Venezuela.

Conservation
Ladenbergia ulei was assessed as "vulnerable" in the 1998 IUCN Red List, where it is said to be native only to Peru. , L. ulei was regarded as a synonym of Ladenbergia muzonensis, which has a wider distribution.

References

Flora of Peru
Flora of Colombia
Flora of Ecuador
Flora of Venezuela
muzonensis
Taxonomy articles created by Polbot